A partial lunar eclipse took place on Saturday, June 25, 1983, the first of two lunar eclipses in 1983 with an umbral eclipse magnitude of 0.33479. A partial lunar eclipse happens when the Earth moves between the Sun and the Full Moon, but they are not precisely aligned. Only part of the Moon's visible surface moves into the dark part of the Earth's shadow. A partial lunar eclipse occurs when the Earth moves between the Sun and Moon but the three celestial bodies do not form a straight line in space. When that happens, a small part of the Moon's surface is covered by the darkest, central part of the Earth's shadow, called the umbra. The rest of the Moon is covered by the outer part of the Earth's shadow called the penumbra. The Earth's shadow on the moon was clearly visible in this eclipse, with 33% of the Moon in shadow; the partial eclipse lasted for 2 hours and 15 minutes.

Visibility 

It was completely visible over Australia, Pacific and the Americas.

Related lunar eclipses

Eclipses in 1983 
 A total solar eclipse at the Moon's ascending node of the orbit on Saturday, June 11th, 1983.
 A partial lunar eclipse at the Moon's descending node of the orbit on Saturday, June 25th, 1983.
 An annular solar eclipse at the Moon's descending node of the orbit on Sunday, December 04th, 1983.
 A penumbral lunar eclipse at the Moon's ascending node of the orbit on Tuesday, December 20th, 1983.

Lunar year series

Half-Saros cycle
A lunar eclipse will be preceded and followed by solar eclipses by 9 years and 5.5 days (a half saros). This lunar eclipse is related to two total solar eclipses of Solar Saros 146.

Saros cycle

See also 
List of lunar eclipses
List of 20th-century lunar eclipses

Notes

External links 
 

1983-06
1983 in science
June 1983 events